Nature Unveiled is an early full-length studio album released by the English group Current 93.

Pressing
1984 12" 1000 black vinyl in regular sleeve (L.A.Y.L.A.H. Antirecords LAY4)
1984 12" 1000 black vinyl in regular sleeve (2nd pressing) (L.A.Y.L.A.H. Antirecords LAY4)
1986 cassette in regular cassette box (Mi-Mort MM005C)
1989 12" 2000 black vinyl in regular sleeve (Maldoror MAL123)
1992 CD in jewel case (Durtro DURTRO009CD)
2010 CD in jewel case with bonus Andrew Liles remix disc (Durtro Jnana 94)

Track listing

Original LP
A

 "Ach Golgotha (Maldoror Is Dead)"

B

 "The Mystical Body of Christ in Chorazaim (The Great in the Small)"

Cassette
A

 "Ach Golgotha (Maldoror Is Dead)"
 "Christ's First Howling"
 "Fields of Rape"

B

 "The Mystical Body of Christ in Chorazaim (The Great in the Small)"
 "I'm the One"

CD

 "Ach Golgotha (Maldoror Is Dead)" - 18:59
 "The Mystical Body of Christ in Chorazaim (The Great in the Small)" - 19:50
 "No Hiding from the Blackbird" - 4:04
 "The Burial of the Sardine - Nurse With Wound" - 6:16
 "LAShTAL" - 3:52
 "Salt" -  3:49
 "Maldoror Rising (Live in Amsterdam 1984)" - 8:55
 "Maldoror Falling (Live in Brighton 1984) - Dogs Blood Order" - 12:13

Personnel
David Tibet
Steven Stapleton
Annie Anxiety
Youth
John Fothergill
Roger Smith
John Murphy
Nick Rogers
John Balance
Fritz Haäman
Andy
Tim Spy

References

1984 debut albums
Current 93 albums